Henry Francis Norberg Jr. (December 22, 1920 – December 4, 1974) was an American football end who played two seasons with the San Francisco 49ers of the All-America Football Conference. He was drafted by the Chicago Bears in the 18th round of the 1943 NFL Draft. He played college football at Stanford University and attended Palo Alto High School in Palo Alto, California.

References

External links
Just Sports Stats

1920 births
1974 deaths
Players of American football from Oakland, California
American football ends
Stanford Cardinal football players
San Francisco 49ers (AAFC) players
Chicago Bears players
San Francisco 49ers players